, commonly shortened to , is a famous set of four picture scrolls, or emakimono, belonging to Kōzan-ji temple in Kyoto, Japan. The Chōjū-giga scrolls are also referred to as Scrolls of Frolicking Animals and Scrolls of Frolicking Animals and Humans in English. Some think that Toba Sōjō created the scrolls; however, it seems clear from the style that more than one artist is involved.  The right-to-left reading direction of Chōjū-jinbutsu-giga  is  traditional in East Asia, and is still common in Japan. Chōjū-jinbutsu-giga  is also credited as the oldest work of manga. The scrolls are now entrusted to the Kyoto National Museum and Tokyo National Museum.

The scrolls are the earliest in a linear monochrome drawing style that was to continue in use in Japanese painting (as they are all done with the usual writing and painting brush, they count as painting).

As opened, the first scroll illustrates anthropomorphic rabbits and monkeys bathing and getting ready for a ceremony, a monkey thief runs from animals with sticks and knocks over a frog from the lively ceremony. Further on, the rabbits and monkeys are playing and wrestling while another group of animals participate in a funeral and frog prays to Buddha as the scroll closes.

The scrolls were also adapted into several novels published by Geijutsuhiroba, the first book simply compiled the scrolls into one publication, now out of print. One of the books participated as part of the company's Fine Arts Log series as well as some were exclusive to certain exhibitions. Other companies like Misuzu Shobo and Shibundō also published books based on the Chōjū-jinbutsu-giga emakimono.

Although Chōjū-jinbutsu-giga is sometimes credited as the first manga, there have been some disputes with the Yomiuri Shimbun newspaper. Seiki Hosokibara pointed to the Shigisan-engi scrolls as the first manga, and Kanta Ishida explained that the scrolls should be treated as masterpieces in their own right.

History 
The Chōjū-jinbutsu-giga emakimono, belonging to the Kōzan-ji temple in Kyoto, Japan as an ancient cultural property, are usually thought to have been painted in the mid-12th century, whereas the third and fourth scrolls may well date from the 13th century.

Most think Toba Sōjō created Chōjū-jinbutsu-giga, who created a painting a lot like Chōjū-jinbutsu-giga; however, it is hard to verify this claim. The drawings of Chōjū-jinbutsu-giga are making fun of Japanese priests in the creator's time period, characterising them as toads, rabbits and monkeys. Chōjū-jinbutsu-giga is read and rolled out from right to left which can still be seen in manga and Japanese books. Chōjū-jinbutsu-giga is credited as being the oldest work of manga in Japan, and is a national treasure as well as many Japanese animators believe it is also the origin of Japanese animated movies. In Chōjū-jinbutsu-giga the animals were drawn with very expressive faces and also sometimes used "speed lines", a technique used in manga til this day. Emakimono like Chōjū-jinbutsu-giga and many others barely were seen in the public until they made their way into popular culture, with many common people imitating the style. Emakimono emerged very popular in the city of Ōtsu, Shiga, and being dubbed Ōtsu-e after its popularity in the city around the 17th century. The first two scrolls are  entrusted to the Tokyo National Museum, and the second two are entrusted to the Kyoto National Museum. The scrolls currently on display at Kōzan-ji are reproductions.

Emakimono 
The first scroll, which is considered the most famous, depicts various animals (frogs, rabbits and monkeys) frolicking as if they were human. There is no writing on any of the scrolls; they consist of pictures only. The first scroll is also the largest, with a length of 11 meters (36 ft) and 30 cm (1 ft) wide. As the first scroll is opened, rabbits and monkeys are bathing and swimming in a lake, moving on past the mountains, cliffs and trees are rabbits and frogs making bow and arrows. Further more, more rabbits and frogs are bringing pots and boxes to a (currently) unknown event. Frogs and rabbits pass by monks with their cattle (wild boar, sika deer) and a monkey runs away, supposedly stealing, and being chased by a rabbit with a long stick, further more a frog is lying on the floor who could have possibly been knocked over by the thief. Nearby, a celebration has started with two frogs dancing, and a group of animals having a conversation. Not too far from the celebration are animals wrestling and fighting and two monkeys holding a box. Far from the celebration are a group of animals at a funeral and a frog praying in front of a frog shaped Budai as the scroll closes.

Gallery

Publications 
Four publications based on Chōjū-jinbutsu-giga have been released by the publisher Geijutsuhiroba. A publication made for the anniversary of Chōjū-giga entitled  was released on October 11, 2007, as a part of the  series. All four scrolls were published in actual size in their boxset publication entitled Chōjū Jinbutsu Giga released June 10, 2008. Exclusive to the Suntory Museum of Art exhibition of Chōjū-giga, the same company released a book entitled . Chōjū-jinbutsu-giga was also released in a shinsōbon (deluxe edition) by Misuzu Shobo. In 1991 a book by Shibundō entitled Chōjū-jinbutsu-giga to Okoe: Emaki was published and written by Nobuo Tsuji.

Disputes 
The Yomiuri Shimbun newspaper with Kanta Ishida discussed different theories of what really is the "first manga". Manga artist, Seiki Hosokibara pointed to Shigisan-engi as the first manga in history. Ishida said that the scrolls be treated as masterpieces in their own right, and not be cubby-holed as just the origin of manga and they have no connection with contemporary manga and the domestic works people are familiar with today.

See also 

Katsushika Hokusai
The Tale of Genji
Konjaku Monogatarishū
Lianhuanhua
Ukiyo-e
Nishiki-e
Hokusai Manga
The Great Wave off Kanagawa

Notes

References 
Paine, Robert Treat, in: Paine, R. T. & Soper A, "The Art and Architecture of Japan", Pelican History of Art, 3rd ed 1981, Penguin (now Yale History of Art),

External links 

Miho Museum page for Chōjū-giga 
The complete first scroll. Note:Click the page number on top of the page

Japanese
Suntory Museum of Art page for Chōjū-giga
Tokyo National Museum page for Chōjū-giga

English
Museum of Art page for Chōjū-giga

12th-century manuscripts
13th-century manuscripts
Animals in art
Buddhist paintings
Entertainment in Japan
Illustration
Japanese culture
Japanese paintings
Manga
National Treasures of Japan
Paintings in the collection of the Tokyo National Museum
History of art in Japan